Walk On is the debut album by guitarist Randy Johnston which was recorded in 1991 and released on the Muse label the following year.

Reception

The AllMusic review by Alex Henderson stated "Randy Johnston is a perfect example of a jazzman who has never been innovative or groundbreaking but is darn good at what he does ... Walk On never pretended to reinvent the jazz wheel, but it was a decent way for him to start his recording career as a leader".

Track listing
All compositions by Randy Johnson except where noted
 "Jumping the Blues (Jumpin' Blues)" (Jay McShann) – 4:14
 "I Almost Lost My Mind" (Ivory Joe Hunter) – 9:09
 "Walk On" – 7:07
 "Crazy He Calls Me" (Carl Sigman, Bob Russell) – 6:32
 "The Queen´s Samba" – 4:30
 "My Shining Hour" (Harold Arlen, Johnny Mercer) – 6:03
 "Please Send Me Someone to Love" (Percy Mayfield) – 7:40
 "Moanin' (Bobby Timmons) – 7:02

Personnel
Randy Johnston – guitar
Bill Easley – saxophone
Benny Green – piano 
Ray Drummond – bass 
Kenny Washington – drums

References

Muse Records albums
Randy Johnston (musician) albums
1992 albums
Albums recorded at Van Gelder Studio